The Norinco HP9-1, also known as the Norinco N870-14.00 and Norinco M982, is a short pump action shotgun made by weapons manufacturer Norinco (North China Industries Corporation).

Description
This 12 gauge smoothbore firearm has a 14-inch (36 cm) barrel and a rust-resistant parkerized finish. It is also available 12.5-inch (31.75cm) and 18-inch (45.72cm) variants. Different sights are available as well ranging from traditional bead sights to ghost ring sights. It is a copy of the Remington 870, a widely distributed design no longer under patent protection, and most of the parts interchange freely. Compact, reliable, and affordable, it is popular with hunters and others working or recreating in grizzly bear habitats.

The Norinco HP9 has seen extensive use in popular media. It has both movie and television appearances. It has also seen use in the popular video games Battlefield 2 (2005), Project Reality (2005) and Battlefield 4 (2013) under the names NOR 982, Norinco 982 and Hawk 12G respectively.

The Norinco HP9 is operated identically to that of any Remington 870 variant or clone and is operated in the same manner. 

The Remington 870 design is both time tested and reliable, seeing heavy use in both military and police roles since the 1950s. The reliability and ruggedness of the Remington 870 are evident in the Norinco HP9.

Legality in the United States
In 1993, the import of most Norinco firearms and ammunition into the United States was blocked under new trade rules when China's permanent normal trade relations status was renewed. The prohibition did not apply to sporting shotguns or shotgun ammunition, however.  

Longer barreled versions (18" minimum) are also available for purchase in the US, where ownership of short barreled shotguns requires a $200 tax stamp. In the United States, where other Norinco products are specifically non-importable, this gun is imported and sold under the names Norinco Hawk 982 and Interstate Hawk 982.

Legality in Canada

As defined by the Criminal Code of Canada a firearm is classified as "prohibited" If the barrel has been shortened to less than 18-inches (457mm), after leaving the factory, "by sawing, cutting or ANY other alteration or modification" that forces the firearm into the "prohibited firearm" class.

The firearm is considered in the "prohibited firearm" class if it left the factory with the barrel at below 18-inches (457mm), barrel length and the overall dimensions of the firearm maintain a length greater than 26-inches (660mm).

The Norinco HP9 can be legally purchased and owned by Canadians as it fall under the non restricted firearm class. The rules and regulations in regard to storage, transportation and handling of non restricted firearms apply.  Non restricted firearms are classified ordinary rifles and shotguns.

Variants
Type 97 original variant without any stock attachment. 
Type 97-1 featuring a fixed stock or side-folding stock.
Type 97-2 feed from a 12 gauge box magazine instead of the internal tube. 
Hawk Series Export variants featuring various configurations.

Competitors

There are several offerings from both domestic and foreign firearms manufactures of shotguns that compete directly with the Norinco HP9 for purpose and price range. Competitors include such well known brands as the Dominion Arms Grizzly, Savage Arms Stevens Model 320 and Mossberg Maverick Model 88.

References

External links
NORINCO's Product Information page
Canadian distributor product page
Modern Firearms Entry
RCMP - Prohibited Frirearms
List of Norinco Firearms seen in movies

Shotguns of the People's Republic of China
Infantry weapons of the Cold War
Pump-action shotguns
Norinco